Alice Miller (born May 15, 1956) is an American professional golfer. She became a member of the LPGA Tour in 1978 and won eight LPGA Tour events, including one major championship, during her career.

Amateur career
Miller was born in Marysville, California. She played on the Marysville HS golf team the first year that golf became coed. She was scouted by Arizona State golf coach. She attended Arizona State University and played on the 1975 AIAW National Collegiate Championship team.

Professional career
Miller joined the LPGA Tour in 1978. Between 1983 and 1991 she won eight titles on the tour, including one major championship, the 1985 Nabisco Dinah Shore. She also had her highest finish on the money list that year, when she placed third. She served as president of the LPGA Tour in 1993. She retired from the LPGA Tour after the 1998 season.

Professional wins

LPGA Tour (8)

LPGA Tour playoff record (2–0)

Other (1)
1985 Mazda Champions (with Don January)

Major championships

Wins (1)

External links

American female golfers
Arizona State Sun Devils women's golfers
LPGA Tour golfers
Winners of LPGA major golf championships
Golfers from California
People from Marysville, California
1956 births
Living people
21st-century American women